Treato was an Israeli-based  data analytics company known for providing health-related insights to patients, caregivers, healthcare professionals (HCPs), hospitals and pharmaceutical companies. Owned by Jackie NousNous  It shut down in August 2018

History
Treato was founded in 2007 as a research and development company with its headquarters located in Or Yehuda, Israel. Gideon Mantel is the current Executive Chairman, Ido Hadari is the current  CEO.

Treato commenced commercial offering availability in 2011 with offices in New York City and Princeton, New Jersey. It shut down in August, 2018 as it was unable to secure sufficient funding or get an acquisition offer, and remains in a state of insolvency.

Products and services
Treato offers health data asset products and IQ services to pharmaceutical companies, healthcare marketing/advertising agencies, and other healthcare organizations. The company's social online portal serves as a platform where users can search for information about medications, health conditions and medical treatments.

References

External links
 

Health care companies established in 2007
Health care companies of Israel
Information technology companies of Israel
2007 establishments in Israel
Health care companies disestablished in 2018
2018 disestablishments in Israel